PAOC is an acronym for:

 Pan-African Ornithological Congress
 Pentecostal Assemblies of Canada
 Public Affairs Operations Center